The 1912 Columbus Panhandles season was an American football team played professional football in the Ohio League. The team featured the Nesser brothers.

Schedule

Players
Player information is based on box scores in published game accounts.
 Buyer - guard
 Burkhart - guard
 Clyder - tackle
 J. Colburn - halfback
 B. Davis - guard
 G. Davis - guard
 S. Davis - halfback
 Deckhart, center
 Jarvis - fullback, center
 Kertzinger/Kurtzinger - fullback, center
 Kierchner - tackle
 Kilogue - end
 R. Kuchner/Kuehne - center, tackle
 O. Kuelemer - tackle
 Lynch - end
 A. Nesser - end
 F. Nesser - halfback, fullback, end
 Frank Nesser - halfback
 J. Nesser - guard, quarterback
 N. Nesser - guard
 P. Nesser - tackle
 R. Nesser - tackle
 Ted Nesser - quarterback, halfback
 Snyder - guard
 Turvey/Turney - end
 Wesser, guard

References

Columbus Panhandles seasons
Columbus Panhandles
Columbus Panhandles